Jacques Servier (9 February 1922 – 16 April 2014) was a French doctor and businessman. He was the founder and president of Laboratoires Servier, a pharmaceutical company.

Biography
Founder of the pharmaceutical group Servier in 1954, he had a fortune estimated at US$7.7 billion.

The group led by him, Servier, had been convicted several times to pay damages for Mediator, trade name of benfluorex. There was a class action also for Isoméride, trade name of dexfenfluramine. There are also active discussions and trial around benfluorex.

Decorations

Legion of Honour
Knight (1976)
Officer (1 December 1987; by Minister of Social Affairs and Employment Philippe Séguin)
Commander (31 December 1992; by Minister for Foreign Trade Dominique Strauss-Kahn)
Grand Officer (25 March 2002; by President Jacques Chirac)
Grand Cross (31 December 2008; by President Nicolas Sarkozy)
National Order of Merit
Officer (1981)
Commander (21 May 1985; by President François Mitterrand)
Ordre des Palmes Académiques
Knight (1980)
Officer (1996)

References

1922 births
2014 deaths
People from Indre
French billionaires
French pharmacologists
French company founders
Grand Croix of the Légion d'honneur
Commanders of the Ordre national du Mérite
Officiers of the Ordre des Palmes Académiques